The Naked Prey is a 1965 American adventure film produced and directed by Cornel Wilde, who also stars in the lead role. Set in the South African veldt, the film's plot centers around a safari guide trying to survive in the veldt's harsh environment, while trying to avoid death at the hands of vengeful African warriors. The story is loosely based on the experiences of American explorer John Colter. The acclaimed screenplay earned writers Clint Johnson and Don Peters an Academy Award nomination for Best Original Screenplay.

The film premiered at the 1965 San Sebastián International Film Festival, then was released in the United States on March 23, 1966. Made on a scant budget of less than $700,000, the film was shot entirely on location in southern Africa.

Plot

Opening

Preface
In colonial era South Africa, a professional safari guide leads one haughty  investor and his troop on an elephant hunt through the African veldt. When the group comes to a local tribe's territory, some of the Africans require a toll to be paid for walking through their territory. They are friendly, peaceful, smiling, and non-violent; the guide demands that they be paid, but the expedition's investor ignores this advice, brushes the Africans aside, and physically knocks the tribal leader to the ground, who is barring his way. Animosity spreads across faces except for the investor. No violent retribution immediately occurs, and the Europeans are allowed to walk past the  warriors guarding their border.

Capture
Later on, the guide and investor are arguing about their elephant kills. The investor brags about killing so many more elephants than anyone else. The guide reminds him, "Everyone else only shot ivory-bearing elephants", to which the investor only laughs. During this conversation, a group of warriors from a local village discovers the poachers' camp, and armed only with spears, captures or kills the entire group of rifle-armed Europeans.

Dispatching the European captives
After a victory march of the Europeans to the African's home village, most are executed using various torture methods. One man is covered in clay, which is allowed to harden, and he is slowly roasted alive by being dangled over a fire. Another victim has multiple leather and rope lashings used on him until dead. Another is chased and killed by village women and children armed with sharpened sticks. The investor, who insulted the tribesmen, is tied up and placed in a ring of fire with an agitated venomous snake.

The Chase

The escape
The guide is spared until the last. He is stripped naked and then an arrow is fired into the air. The guide is ordered at the point of a spear to run; he runs and once he passes the fallen arrow, he is chased by another warrior in waiting. His pursuer throws a spear at him and misses, which the guide uses to kill his pursuer. Afterwards, he takes the warrior's supplies and evades his captors. The Warriors, grief-stricken about their dead friend, argue about continuing the hunt. The guide flees, and some of them continue the pursuit.

The Middle-Eastern slavers
Over the course of the pursuit, several of the warriors fall, either killed by the guide or the ravenous wildlife. The guide is able to find and eat a snail, an onion, a snake, and any type of food that comes his way in the wild. Eventually, he comes across an African village and camps nearby. He succeeds in stealing some barbecue and to sneak away, only to be awoken later by the rifle fire of Middle-Eastern slavers (the audience must deduce this from their turbans and use of Jezails muskets inscribed with the words from the Qur'an).

During this, the guide cuts captured slaves from their rope bindings, has a minor melee with the slave guards, and prepares to meet the slaver captain in combat, just as the captain falls into a ditch filled with large thorns that enter his eyes.

The orphan girl
Amid the chaos of the melee, he meets an African girl (6 to 8 years old) who is hiding from the slavers. The slavers were closing on their location, and although never having met her, he runs out as a diversion, where he witnesses the thorn death of the slaver captain. He eventually escapes the slavers by jumping into a river, but is incapacitated after going over a large waterfall. Luckily, the girl finds him on the river bank and is able to revive him. They become friends after that, and as she travels with him for the next few days, he sings a 19th-century drinking song "Little Brown Jug". The child in return sings a song in her own language, and they attempt, with much humor, to sing each other's songs. They later part ways near an area that she indicates as her homeland, which she is unwilling to leave.

Ending
His surviving pursuers continue tracking him. The guide finally spots a colonial fort (the fort from which the safari had originally set out), just a short distance ahead of him. The lead pursuer, now running closely behind him, is shot dead by rifle fire from the fort's colonial soldiers, just a second before the warrior can land a fatal blow. When the guide finally reaches the safety of the fort, amidst the movements of the colonial troops, he turns and gives a saluting nod to the leader of his pursuers, who returns it, acknowledging the guide's final victory.

Cast
 Cornel Wilde as Man: The guide, who is the unnamed protagonist of the film, and the eponymous "naked prey." He is a professional safari guide, and by the end of the movie, he is left as the sole survivor of his group after all other members are murdered by tribesmen. 
 Gert van den Bergh as 2nd Man: A member of the safari troupe. He is killed by the tribe. 
 Ken Gampu as Leader of the Warriors: The leader of the tribe who is disrespected by the safari travellers. 
 Bella Randels as Little Girl: A native girl who saves the safari guide from drowning and accompanies him on his passage.
 Patrick Mynhardt as Safari Overseer/Slave Dealer/Irish Soldier: Mynhardt plays three roles.
 Sandy Nkomo, Eric Mcanyana, John Marcus, Richard Mashiya, Franklyn Mdhluli, Fusi Zazayokwe, Joe Dlamini,	Jose Sithole and Horace Gilman play warriors that pursue the guide.

Production
The Naked Prey was filmed on location in Southern Africa. The film's screenplay was only nine pages long. The film's opening titles were accompanied by paintings illustrated by local artist Andrew Motjuoadi.

Critical reception
The minimal dialog, richly realized African settings, and emphasis on making "the chase (and violent combat along the way) a subject unto itself, rather than the climax to a conventional story" distinguish Naked Prey as an innovative and influential adventure film. However, although it is considered a small classic today, it received mixed reviews at the time of its release. Robert Alden of The New York Times, reacting to the brutality of some of the early scenes, dismissed the film as "poor and tasteless motion-picture entertainment", but did acknowledge its "authentic African setting" and "effective use of tribal drums and native music." Roger Ebert of Chicago Sun-Times, taking a different tack, called The Naked Prey "pure fantasy" of the "great white hunter" variety, adding: "Sure, it's nice to think you could outrun half a dozen hand-picked African warriors simply because you'd been to college and read Thoreau, but the truth is they'd nail you before you got across the river and into the trees."

Other reviewers, however, were more enthusiastic. In Time, the film was described as "a classic, single-minded epic of survival with no time out for fainthearted blondes or false heroics" where "natives are not the usual faceless blacks but human beings whose capacity for violence the hero quickly matches." Variety reviewer praised the documentary-style use of nature photography to show "the pattern of repose, pursuit, sudden death and then repose" that characterizes the entire chase.

Retrospectively, the film's reception has grown better. On Rotten Tomatoes, the film holds an approval rating of 86%, based on 14 reviews, with an average rating of 6.93/10. Metacritic gave the film a 64 out of 100 rating, indicating "generally favorable reviews, based on 12 reviews. In July 2016, Matthew Thrift of the British Film Institute named the film among the 10 greatest "chase films" and praised its "lush widescreen lensing" that "captures all the natural beauty and brutality of the African savannah".

Accolades

Home media
The Naked Prey was released on DVD by The Criterion Collection in January 2008.

Soundtrack
The soundtrack consists of African tribal chants, natural sounds, and occasional dialogue, in English and otherwise. There are no subtitles, and incidental music is mostly absent. It features Nguni tribal songs specifically recorded for the film. A vinyl LP The Naked Prey was released in 1966 on Folkways Records. It was re-released as Cornel Wilde's The Naked Prey in CD form on Latitude/Locust Music in 2004.

Comic book adaptation
 Dell Movie Classic: The Naked Prey (December 1966)

Cinematic influence
As teenagers, Joel and Ethan Coen shot their own version of The Naked Prey on a Super 8 film camera. They called it Zeimers in Zambia and cast neighbor Mark Zimering in the lead role.

Cultural influence
The progressive rock group Coheed and Cambria originally was named Shabütie after the African chant from the film. Shabütie translates to "Naked Prey".

In popular culture
In the first scene of the Mad Men season 5 episode "Far Away Places," Abe coaxes a distracted and reluctant Peggy to go see the film with him. His pitch: "You're resisting a chance to see Cornel Wilde naked? I heard he wrestles a boa constrictor. Sounds pretty dirty."

The 266th episode of Cheers is titled "Bar Wars VII: The Naked Prey".

In the movie Where's Poppa?, the main character's brother (played by Ron Leibman) is regularly mugged while taking a shortcut through Central Park. In one mugging, the group of muggers refer to The Naked Prey as they strip him and then chase him. Garrett Morris plays one of the muggers.

See also
 Survival film, about the film genre, with a list of related films

Notes

References

External links
 
 
  
 The Naked Prey: Into the Wild an essay by Michael Atkinson at the Criterion Collection

1965 films
1960s adventure drama films
American adventure drama films
1960s chase films
American chase films
Films adapted into comics
American films based on actual events
Films directed by Cornel Wilde
Films about hunters
Films set in South Africa
Films set in the 19th century
Films shot in Zimbabwe
American survival films
Films about death games
1965 drama films
1960s American films